Discontinuous-constituent Phrase Structure Grammar (DCPSG) (distinct from Discontinuous Phrase Structure Grammar/DPSG) is a formalism for describing discontinuous phrase structures in natural language, such as verb phrases in VSO languages. The formalism was introduced in the slightly more constrained form of Discontinuous-constituent Phrase Structure Grammar with Subscripts and Deletes (DCPSGsd) in Harman (1963). DCPSGs describe a superset of the context-free languages, by means of rewrite rules that permit a limited amount of wrapping, similar to that found in Head grammar.

Description

Rewrite rules of a DCPSG are identical to those of a CFG, with the addition of a meta-symbol, denoted here as an underscore. DCPSG rules therefore have the general form  where  is a string of terminal symbols and/or non-terminal symbols and at most one underscore.

Using strict left-most productions,  is simply inserted immediately after the non-terminal that follows  prior to the rewrite.

Example

We can characterize the gross sentence structure of a VSO language such as Irish with the following rules (substituting English words for Irish words, and using subscripts solely for demonstration of discontinuity):

 S -> VP\ NP_{subj}

 VP -> ITV ~|~ TV \ \_ \ NP_{obj}

 NP -> \it{John} ~|~ \it{Susan} ~|~ ...

 ITV -> \it{ran} ~|~ \it{danced} ~|~ ...

 TV -> \it{saw} ~|~ \it{met} ~|~ ...

A derivation for the sentence saw John Susan, where John is the subject, and Susan is the direct object forming a VP with saw is:

 S -> VP\ NP_{subj} -> TV\ NP_{subj} NP_{obj} -> \mathit{saw}\ NP_{subj}\ NP_{obj} -> \mathit{saw}\ \mathit{John}\ NP_{obj} -> \mathit{saw}\ \mathit{John}\ \mathit{Mary}

References

Formal languages
Grammar frameworks